Koton is a Turkish multinational clothing company. As of 2015, the chain had over 480 retail stores in 28 countries.

History
Koton started in 1988 with a  store in Kuzguncuk.

References

External links
 

Clothing brands of Turkey
Clothing companies of Turkey
Companies based in Istanbul
Turkish brands